Bathyagoninae is a subfamily of marine ray-finned fishes belonging to the family Agonidae, part of the sculpin superfamily Cottoidea. These fishes are found in the Pacific and Atlantic Oceans.

Genera
Bathyagoninae contains following 3 genera:

References

Agonidae
 
Ray-finned fish subfamilies